Tityus may refer to:

 A giant from Greek mythology (see Tityos)
 A genus of scorpions (see Tityus (genus))

Art
 The Punishment of Tityus (Michelangelo)
 Tityus (Titian)
 Tityos (Ribera)